Vriesea costae is a plant species of bromeliad in the genus Vriesea. This species is endemic to Brazil.

References

costae
Flora of Brazil
Plants described in 2001